Trochetiopsis erythroxylon, the Saint Helena redwood, is a species of plant, now extinct in the wild. It was formerly abundant enough in the upland parts of the island of Saint Helena for early settlers in the 17th century to use the timber to make their homes. It became extinct in the 1950's due to deforestation as its habitat was cleared to make way for pasture, timber and fuel.

The St. Helena Redwood was used as an early example of ex situ conservation when the governor of St. Helena obtained a couple seedlings and planted them in his garden. It now exists in cultivation, although cultivated stock is weak. This species has pendant flowers, petals that turn pink with age, and white staminodes.

Saint Helena redwood is completely unrelated to the redwood tree of California and other trees called redwood.

It is, however, in the same genus as the Saint Helena ebony (Trochetiopsis ebenus) and a hybrid between them (Trochetiopsis × benjamini) is now often planted on the island.

See also
Flora of St Helena

References

 Cronk, Q. C. .. “The Decline of the Redwood Trochetiopsis Erythroxylon on St Helena.” Biological Conservation, vol. 26, no. 2, Elsevier Ltd, 1983, pp. 163-74

External links

erythroxylon
Flora of Saint Helena